"Let us not go like lambs to the slaughter!" (Hebrew: !אל נלך כצאן לטבח) is a pamphlet and manifesto created in 1942 by Jewish partisan and poet Abba Kovner to try to convince Jews in the Vilnius area to take up arms against their German invaders.

Background 
On June 22, 1941, Nazi Germany launched their invasion of the Soviet Union, which included Kovner's homeland of Lithuania. As the Germans took control of the land, they began to institute anti-Jewish policies as part of the larger Holocaust. Kovner knew of the German plan to kill Jews, among other groups, and urged a militant response to it. The pamphlet, distributed around Vilnius, reminded Jews of various atrocities committed by the Germans, and called upon them to fight back in self-defense.

References 

Pamphlets
Manifestos
Jewish literature